Burger Creek (also spelled Berger Branch) is a stream in Moniteau County in the U.S. state of Missouri. It is a tributary of North Moreau Creek.

Burger Creek has the name of Frank Berger, the original owner of the site.

References

Rivers of Moniteau County, Missouri
Rivers of Missouri